The CONCACAF Gold Cup is the main association football  competition of the men's national football teams governed by CONCACAF, determining the continental champion of North America, which includes Central America and the Caribbean. The Gold Cup is held every two years. The tournament succeeded the CONCACAF Championship (1963–1989), with its inaugural edition being held in 1991.

North American Football Union's members Canada, United States and Mexico are the only three nations to have won the tournament.

History

Championships before CONCACAF
Before the Confederation of North, Central America and Caribbean Association Football (CONCACAF) was formed in 1961, association football in the region was divided into smaller, regional divisions. The two main bodies consisted of the Confederación Centroamericana y del Caribe de Fútbol (CCCF) founded in 1938 (consisting of Central America and most of the Caribbean) and the North American Football Confederation (NAFC) founded in 1946 (consisting of the North American nations of United States, Mexico, Canada, and Cuba). Each confederation held its own competition, the CCCF Championship and the NAFC Championship. The CCCF held 10 championships from 1941 to 1961 with Costa Rica winning seven times. The NAFC held four championships in 1947 and 1949, and after 41 years of absence, in 1990 and 1991 for the North American zone as the North American Nations Cup with Mexico winning three times and Canada winning once.

CONCACAF Championship (1963–1989)

CONCACAF was founded in 1961 through the merging of NAFC and CCCF which resulted in a single championship being held for the continent. The first CONCACAF tournament was held in 1963 in El Salvador with Costa Rica becoming the first champion. The CONCACAF Campeonato de Naciones, as it was called, was held every two years from 1963 to 1973. The second tournament was held in Guatemala in 1965 when Mexico defeated the host country in the final of a six-team tournament. The 1967 competition was held in Honduras and saw a third champion crowned, Guatemala. Costa Rica won their second title as hosts in 1969, knocking off Guatemala, while two years later, Mexico won their second championship as the tournament moved to Trinidad & Tobago, the first time in the Caribbean. In 1973, the tournament kept the same format of six teams playing a single round-robin, but there were bigger stakes attached: CONCACAF's berth in the FIFA World Cup tournament in 1974. In Port-au-Prince, Haiti, the host country pulled off an upset by winning the tournament and claiming a spot in the World Cup in West Germany.

With the Campeonato de Naciones doubling as the final World Cup qualifying tournament, the next two editions were held in Mexico City and Tegucigalpa, Honduras in 1977 and 1981, respectively. In each case the host country was crowned champion and earned a spot in the World Cup. In 1985 and 1989, the winner of the World Cup qualifying tournament was again crowned Confederation champion. Canada and Costa Rica were named champions in 1985 and 1989, receiving a trophy.

CONCACAF Gold Cup (since 1991)

In 1990, CONCACAF renamed and restructured the CONCACAF Championship as the CONCACAF Gold Cup, with the United States hosting the first competition in 1991, and hosting or co-hosting every subsequent iteration of the tournament (as of 2021). The host country was the inaugural champion of the eight-team tournament. Mexico dominated the remainder of the decade, winning three consecutive CONCACAF Gold Cup titles in 1993, 1996 and 1998.

In 1996, the Gold Cup field included its first guest team, the defending FIFA World Cup Champions Brazil. Guests were invited to participate in the six Gold Cup tournaments from 1996 to 2005. Starting with the 2000 Gold Cup, the tournament field was increased to twelve teams and for the 2007 tournament, the Gold Cup again was contested exclusively by nations within CONCACAF.

The 2007 Gold Cup hosts successfully defended their title beating Mexico in the final 2–1 in Chicago; Canada and Guadeloupe shared third place. Mexico won the 2009 Gold Cup by beating the United States 5–0. In the 2011 Gold Cup, Mexico defeated the USA 4–2 in the final while the USA won the 2013 Gold Cup by beating Panama 1–0.

Since the formation of the Gold Cup in 1991, the CONCACAF Championship has been won eight times by Mexico, seven times by the United States, and once by Canada. Runners-up include Brazil, Colombia, Costa Rica, Honduras, Panama, and Jamaica.

Before 2015, when the Gold Cup did not fall in the same year as the FIFA Confederations Cup, the winner, or highest-placed team that is a member of both CONCACAF and FIFA, qualified for the next staging of that tournament. In 2015, the winners of the previous two Gold Cups (the 2013 and 2015 editions) faced each other in CONCACAF Cup – a playoff to determine the CONCACAF entrant to the 2017 Confederations Cup.

In January 2017, Victor Montagliani announced the expansion of the Gold Cup from 12 to 16 teams, starting with the 2019 tournament. In November 2018, Costa Rica was announced as one of the hosts of the 2019 tournament, with a group B double-header set to be held at the Estadio Nacional.  In April 2019, it was announced that Jamaica would host a doubleheader in group C at Independence Park.

Evolution of the format
The number of teams and the format of each final tournament have varied over the years. In most tournaments, the tournament consists of a round-robin group stage followed by a single-elimination knockout stage.

Results 

Notes

Records and statistics

Champions' results in the Confederations Cup

Awards

There are currently six post-tournament awards
 Best Player – for most valuable player.
 Top Goalscorer – for most prolific goal scorer.
 Best Goalkeeper  – for most outstanding goalkeeper.
 Best Young Player  – for most young player. 
 Team of the Tournament – for best combined team of players at the tournament.
 Goal of the Tournament – for best goal, first awarded in 2021.
 Fair Play Award – for the team with the best record of fair play.

Invitees
The 1996 CONCACAF Gold Cup was the first iteration to have a guest from a different confederation, Brazil from CONMEBOL. In spite of bringing their under-23 team, Brazil finished as runner-ups to Mexico and outplaced seven teams from CONCACAF. For the next decade, six countries from three confederations would make appearances in the Gold Cup, with seven of the eleven appearances finishing within the top four. Starting in 2007, CONCACAF would no longer invite guests from other confederations. This is primarily due to giving more opportunities from teams in the region to compete, as there was a rise in performances from the region hinted by the FIFA World Ranking.

After a 16 year hiatus from guest nations, Qatar were invited and participated in the 2021 CONCACAF Gold Cup, losing in the semi-finals to the United States. Qatar are also scheduled to participate in 2023.

Invitees nations record

Media coverage
In the United States, the CONCACAF Gold Cup airs on Fox Sports and Univision (since 2000). In Mexico it airs on Televisa and TV Azteca. In Canada, after years on Sportsnet and TSN, it has been broadcast exclusively on OneSoccer since 2021.

Trophy
The Gold Cup trophy is awarded to the champions of the tournament. The design of the trophy has changed multiple times since its inaugural version. Changes include scaling down of the size as well as replacing the original flat rectangular base with an elevated round pedestal. The base includes engravings of the champion nation with the year in which they won the trophy.

See also
 Continental football championships
 CCCF Championship (1941–1961)
 North American Nations Cup (1947, 1949, 1990, 1991)
 CONCACAF Nations League

References

External links

 
 Copa Oro coverage on Univision.com
 Gold Cup at RSSSF
 Gold Cup & Championship on RSSSF Archive

 
Gold Cup
Recurring sporting events established in 1991
1991 establishments in North America
Association football events